Souterrain house or slope house is a house with soil or rock completely covering the bottom floor on one side and partly two of the walls on the bottom floor. The house has two entries depending on the ground level.

The main reason for building a souterrain house is due to the landscape, for example the land where the house should be built is placed on a hill or a slope on a mountain. Opposite to earth shelter the primary reason is not to use the thermal mass from the surrounding to insulate the house. Sometimes the soil is excavated to make the floor area the same on both upper and lower floor, the soil can also be partly excavated making the area for the lower floor smaller. When a house is built in a slope the advantage in an open country is the view, mountain, lake or meadow.

See also
 Earth shelter

References

Building engineering
House types